Dirina monothalamia is a species of corticolous (bark-dwelling) in the family Roccellaceae. It occurs in Cape Verde and the nearby mainland of Senegal, where it is found in coastal outcrops on the bark of various trees; Senegalese populations are often on the bark of African baobab.

Taxonomy

The lichen was formally described as a new species in 1837 by Antoine Laurent Apollinaire Fée as Chiodecton africanum, with a type specimen collected from Senegambia. In 2013, Anders Tehler and Damien Ertz proposed the new replacement name for the taxon. The species epithet monothalamia was the first epithet used by Antoine Laurent Apollinaire Fée for the original material of Chiodecton africanum, before he crossed it out and replaced it with africanum; this epithet could not be reused as it has been used for a different species in the interim (Diploschistes africanus ), and is thus unavailable.

Description

The lichen has a thallus that can grow on both rocks and tree bark, with a surface that is either flat or slightly bumpy. It ranges in color from creamy white to dark brown and is between 0.1 and 0.7 mm thick. There are no soralia present.

The lichen has ascomata that are circular, with a diameter up to 2 mm. The ascomata are sessile, meaning they have no stalk, and the base is constricted. The  of the ascomata is covered in a white, even surface or a finely , -covered surface . The ascospores of the lichen are between 23 and 28 by 4–5 μm in size.

Erythrin, lecanoric acid, and an unidentified substance "C" are lichen products that occur in Dirina monothalamia.

References

monothalamia
Lichen species
Lichens described in 2013
Lichens of Africa